Amir Qayyum (born 1981) was a Pakistani serial killer who killed 14 homeless men in Lahore, Pakistan.

Biography
Amir Qayyum was born in 1981 in Pakistan. As a child, Qayyum was abandoned by his father and went to live with his uncle, a Dr. Shahid. Qayyum displayed violent tendencies at a young age and was thrown out of school. He would also be thrown out of his house by his brothers and sisters after he would beat them up. On September 25, 2003, Shahid and a friend were murdered by unidentified assailants. On February 28, 2004 a suspect named Hafiz Abid was arrested but shot and killed himself in a police van after taking a gun from a sleeping policeman.  His uncle's murder caused Qayyum to want to take revenge against society. From June to July 2005, Amir Qayyum killed 14 homeless men with bricks or stones and was known as "The brick killer". He was caught after assaulting a man with a stone. He was sentenced to death on May 10, 2006.

See also
List of serial killers by country
List of serial killers by number of victims

References

1981 births
21st-century criminals
Criminals from Lahore
Living people
Male serial killers
Pakistani people convicted of murder
Pakistani serial killers
People convicted of murder by Pakistan
Prisoners sentenced to death by Pakistan
Violence against men in Asia